Queensville (Rollick Airpark) Aerodrome  is  Queensville, Ontario, Canada.

References

Registered aerodromes in Ontario